The Missouri History Museum in Forest Park, St. Louis, Missouri, showcases Missouri history. It is operated by the Missouri Historical Society, which was founded in 1866.  Museum admission is free through a public subsidy by the Metropolitan Zoological Park and Museum District.

Facilities

The Jefferson Memorial Building, built in 1913 with profits from the Louisiana Purchase Exposition, is the  home of the museum.

In 1988, the museum joined the Metropolitan Zoological Park and Museum District and began receiving sales tax revenue.

In 2000, the Emerson Center, a significant building addition was completed, boosting attendance and exhibition capacity. The Emerson Center, featuring a ground-to-roof southern glass facade, was designed by Hellmuth, Obata & Kassabaum, and included substantially more exhibition space, as well as an auditorium, classrooms, a restaurant and gift shop. The Emerson Center was selected by the American Institute of Architects's Committee on the Environment as an example of architectural design that protects and enhances the environment. It is an example of a green museum.

Collections and exhibits

The museums signature collection includes both national artifacts, as well as Missouri and St. Louis related materials, such as local colonial and native artifacts, Louisiana Purchase Exposition artifacts, and items relating to Charles Lindbergh and his trans-Atlantic flight in the Spirit of St. Louis. A replica of the Spirit of St. Louis can be found in the museum. A large number of artifacts from the 1804-1806 Lewis and Clark Expedition are also housed in the permanent collection, as St. Louis was the starting point for that venture.

Recent travelling exhibits and events have included items related to the Fox Theatre's restoration and renovation, the Road to Freedom tour (celebrating the Americans with Disabilities Act), and, prominently, the Lewis and Clark National Bicentennial Exhibition.

Admission

Admission is free.

Exhibits
1904 World's Fair
Charles Lindbergh

References

External links

Missouri History Museum Web Site, Missouri History Museum
Online Collections, Missouri History Museum Online Collections

Museums in St. Louis
History museums in Missouri
Forest Park (St. Louis)
History
1866 establishments in Missouri